Evan Park Howell (December 10, 1839August 6, 1905) was an American politician and early telegraph operator, as well as an officer in the Confederate Army during the American Civil War.

Early years and education
Evan Howell was born to Effie Howell (née Park) and Atlanta pioneer Clark Howell, Sr. in Warsaw, Georgia (then in Forsyth County, now Milton County) on December 10, 1839. He became a runner and pupil of Atlanta's first telegraph operator, D.U. Sloan, at the age of twelve. In 1855 he attended Georgia Military Institute in Marietta. He read law in Sandersville, and briefly practiced law in Atlanta before the outbreak of war.

Military service
In 1861, he joined the infantry, enlisting in Georgia's First Regiment.  Within 2 years, Howell was promoted to first lieutenant. He fought under Stonewall Jackson in Virginia, and then was sent west, where he fought in the Battle of Chickamauga and the Atlanta Campaign, in which he defended the city as a captain of artillery. He ended the war in Hardee's Corps as captain of Howell's Battery, Georgia Light Artillery.

Business and political career
Upon his return, he farmed for two years, clearing and selling lumber on his father's land near Atlanta. Then for a year he was a reporter, then city editor, of Atlanta's Daily Intelligencer. In 1869 he returned to practicing law and served in a number of political positions including member of city council, member of the state Senate, and solicitor-general of the Atlanta circuit. One of his law clients was The Atlanta Constitution, where he learned E.Y. Clarke was willing to sell his one half interest in the paper. In 1876, Howell purchased the 50% interest in The Constitution and became its editor-in-chief. For the next 25 years, the paper was owned by Howell and the managing partner, William Hemphill. Both Hemphill, and later Howell, would go on to serve as Mayor of Atlanta.

With Richard Peters, Samuel M. Inman, Lemuel Grant, and James W. English, he purchased the buildings on the site of the International Cotton Exposition of 1881 and made it the Exposition Cotton Mills, which were successful for many years.

While editor of the Constitution in 1895, he sent out transcripts of Booker T. Washington's separate as the fingers speech across the country.

He served on the Atlanta City Council numerous times, and served as mayor shortly before his death there on August 6, 1905. His son Clark Howell took up his mantle at the Constitution.

References

External links
 

Mayors of Atlanta
1839 births
1905 deaths
People of Georgia (U.S. state) in the American Civil War
Confederate States Army officers
People from Marietta, Georgia
People from Sandersville, Georgia
American lawyers admitted to the practice of law by reading law